Lipót Sport Egyesület is a professional football club based in Lipót, Győr-Moson-Sopron County, Hungary. The club competes in the Győr-Moson-Sopron county league.

External links
 Profile on Magyar Futball

References

Football clubs in Hungary
Association football clubs established in 1968
1968 establishments in Hungary
Győr-Moson-Sopron County